Darko Radulović (born July 19, 1980) is a Macedonian former professional basketball shooting guard and coach, who currently serves as head coach for Hübner Nyíregyháza BS of the Nemzeti Bajnokság I/A, the top division of Hungary.

External links

References

1980 births
Sportspeople from Skopje
Macedonian men's basketball players
Living people
Macedonian people of Serbian descent
KK MZT Skopje players
KK Vardar players
Shooting guards